The 16th annual Nuestra Belleza México pageant was held at the Centro de Convenciones Yucatán Siglo XXI of Mérida, Yucatán, Mexico on September 20, 2009. It was the second time there were back-to-back victories for a state in Nuestra Belleza México history: Ximena Navarrete from Jalisco was crowned by outgoing Nuestra Belleza México titleholder Karla Carrillo also from Jalisco. She was the third Jalisciense to win this title. Thirty-four contestants of the Mexican Republic competed for the national title. Navarrete competed in Miss Universe 2010 in the US and won the Universal Title.

The Nuestra Belleza Mundo México title was won by Anabel Solís from Yucatán, who competed in Miss World 2010 in China. Solís was crowned by outgoing Nuestra Belleza Mundo México titleholder Perla Beltrán. She is the first and only Yucateca and second with red hair to win this Title.

The recognition "Corona al Mérito 2009" was for Lilián Villanueva, Nuestra Belleza Internacional México 2000 and Reina Internacional de las Flores 2001.

Results

Placements

Order of Announcements

Top 15
Querétaro
Chihuahua
Jalisco
Zacatecas
Sinaloa
Aguascalientes
Estado de México
Jalisco
Coahuila
Sonora
Nuevo León
Chiapas
Baja California
Yucatán
Distrito Federal

Top 10
Zacatecas
Chihuahua
Coahuila
Sonora
Distrito Federal
Yucatán
Jalisco
Sinaloa
Jalisco
Chiapas

Top 5
Jalisco
Jalisco
Sinaloa
Zacatecas
Yucatán

Special Awards

Judges 
They were the same judges at the Preliminary and Final Competition.
Carla Estrada - Television Producer
David Salomon - Fashion Designer
Elisa Nájera - Nuestra Belleza México 2007
Francisco Contreras - Fashion Producer
Laura de la Torre - Vice-President of Fuller Cosmetics
Luis Moya - Cosemtic Dermatologist
Maru Ruiz - Magazine Editor
René Strickler - Actor
Sergio Mayer - Actor
Valentino Lanús - Actor

Background music
Opening Number: "Medley of the host State" by Contestants
Swimsuit Competition: "Desechable" by Telefunka
Intermediate: "Rompiendo Cadenas" by Ana Bárbara
Intermediate: "Mujeres" by Alexander Acha
Evening Gown Competition: Telefunka
Crowning Moment: "Nuestra Belleza México" (Official Theme)

Contestants

Replacements
 - Melissa Solano was the winner of Nuestra Belleza Tamaulipas 2009. The Suplente/1st Runner-up, Ana Karen González was who represented Tamaulipas in Nuestra Belleza México 2009. Melissa Solano was dethroned from the band and crown without clarifying the causes.

Designates
 - Mildreth Jiménez
 - Sandra Luz Vargas
 - Paulina Cabrera
 - Gabriela Bórquez

Returning states
Last competed in 2004:

Last competed in 2007:
 Estado de México

Withdrawals

Significance
Jalisco won the Nuestra Belleza México in 2008 and 2009 (second in Nuestra Belleza México's History)
Yucatán won the Nuestra Belleza Mundo México title for the first time.
Zacatecas was the Suplente/1st Runner-up for the first time.
For the second time a Titleholders were dethroned to the title (Verónica Llamas, Nuestra Belleza Zacatecas 2009 and Melissa Solano Nuestra Belleza Tamaulipas 2009).
This was the last time the delegates made an opening singing a medley of the host state.
Estado de México and  Quintana Roo return to competition after two years (2007) and Tlaxcala after five years (2004).
Jalisco placed for sixth consecutive year in the Top 5.
Sinaloa  placed for second consecutive year in the Top 5.
Jalisco and Nuevo León placed for seventh consecutive year.
Sonora placed for fourth consecutive year.
Chiapas placed for third consecutive year.
Aguascalientes, Baja California, Querétaro and Sinaloa placed for second consecutive year.
Estado de México returned to making calls to the semifinals after six years (2003), Zacatecas after four years (2005), Coahuila after three years (2006), Chihuahua, Distrito Federal and Yucatán after two years (2007).
States that were called to the semifinals last year and this year failed to qualify were Baja California Sur, Guanajuato, San Luis Potosí and Tabasco.
For the fourth time Ernesto Laguardia hosted Nuestra Belleza México, and for the first time with Marisol González, Alma San Martín and Sebastian Rulli.
Sinaloa won Miss Top Model for second time (before 2008).
Zacatecas won Contestants' Choice for the first time.
Chihuahua won Miss Talent for the first time.
Querétaro won Miss Sports for the first time.
Jalisco won the Academic Award for the first time and Fuller Beauty Queen for second time (before 2008).
Nuevo León won the Steps to Fame Award for the first time.
Coahuila won Personality Fraiche Award for the first time.
Yucatán won Best National Costume for third time (before 2001 and 2007) and Sensodyne Waitening Award for the first time.
The host delegate, Anabel Solís from Yucatán, won the Nuestra Belleza Mundo México title.
Yucatán (Anabel Solís) is the higher delegate in this edition (1.81 m).
Michoacán (Itzel García) is the lower delegate in this edition (1.70 m).

Contestants notes
 - Abigaíl González was Princess in Reina Nacional de la Feria de San Marcos 2008 in Aguascalientes.
 - Claudia Espinoza competed in World Miss University 2008, finishing as 4th Runner-up. It was celebrated in Korea. Also she was elected to represent Mexico in Miss Tourism International 2011 but she didn't place.
 - Giannina Huerta competed in Miss Tourism Queen of the Year International 2010 in China representing Mexico where she was a semifinalist in the Top 15 and won Miss Photogenic award. She was the Local Director of Nuestra Belleza Colima 2010 - 2013.
 - Ximena Navarrete was named Miss Universe 2010 at the Mandalay Bay Events Center in the Mandalay Bay Resort and Casino, Las Vegas, Nevada, United States on August 23, 2010,  making her the second Mexican delegate to win the title, after Lupita Jones in 1991. Both were crowned in Las Vegas. On February 10, 2011, she became the official face of L'Oreal Paris and Old Navy. During her reign, Navarrete traveled to Spain, Mexico, Indonesia, China, France, India, Russia, Dominican Republic, Puerto Rico, Panama, Thailand, Brazil, Guatemala, Chile and Bahamas in addition to numerous trips around the United States.
 - Adriana Treviño had been the 3rd Runner-up in Nuestra Belleza Nuevo León 2008. After to compete in Nuestra Belleza México she was moved to Mexico City to work as a Professional Model.
 - Sarahí Carrillo competed in the first Reina Internacional del Transporte pageant in Duitama, Colombia in January 2010 where she was finalist in the Top 6. Also she competed in Miss Latin America 2010 held on June 5, 2010, in Punta Cana, Dominican Republic where she was the 2nd Runner-up. She is a professional model in the Baxt Agency.
 - Anabel Solís competed in Miss World 2010 held in Crown of Beauty Theatre in Sanya, People's Republic of China on October 30, 2010, but she didn't place. She failed to make the semifinalists, ending Mexico's six year streak of consecutive placements in Miss World, from 2004 through 2009.
 - Verónica Llamas was dethroned as Nuestra Belleza Zacatecas 2009 for posing topless in a magazine for men, so breaking a clause in the contract of Nuestra Belleza México, she also lost the right to represent Mexico in Miss Continente Americano 2010 held in Guayaquil, Ecuador, and her replacement was Karla Carrillo.

Crossovers

Contestants who had competed or will compete at other beauty pageants:

Miss Universe
 2010: : Ximena Navarrete (Winner)

Miss World
 2010: : Anabel Solis

Miss Latin America
 2010: : Sarahí Carrillo (2nd Runner-up)

Miss Tourism International
 2011: : Claudia Espinoza (2nd Runner-up)

World Miss University
 2008: : Claudia Espinoza (4th Runner-up)

Reina Internacional del Transporte
 2010: : Sarahí Carrillo (Top 6)

Miss Tourism Queen of the Year International
 2010: : Giannina Huerta (Top 15)

Reina de la Feria de San Marcos
 2008: : Abigaíl González (Princess)

Nuestra Belleza Nuevo León
 2008: : Adriana Treviño (3rd Runner-up)

References

External links
Official Website

.Mexico
2009 in Mexico
2009 beauty pageants